Punta Gorda Airport  is an airport serving Punta Gorda, a town on Amatique Bay in the Toledo District of southern Belize. The airport is within the town, and less than a kilometer from the bay.

Facilities 
Northeast approach and departure are over the water.

Airlines and destinations 
The following airlines offer scheduled passenger service:

See also

Transport in Belize
List of airports in Belize

References

External links
OurAirports - Punta Gorda Airport

Aerodromes in Belize - pdf

Airports in Belize
Toledo District